George Fraser Ritchie (1909–1993) was a Scottish rugby union player. His regular playing position was Number 8.

Rugby Union career

Amateur career

George Ritchie was educated at the High School of Dundee and Strathallan School in Perthshire. He played his club rugby for Dundee HSFP and was captain for three years between 1928 and 1931.

Provincial career

Ritchie played for Midlands District.

International career

He was named in the Scottish trial team of January 1930 but had to wait two years before gaining his cap. Scotland lost to England 16–3 at Twickenham on 19 March. He was the grandfather of noted Scottish rugby player Andy Nicol.

See also
1932 Home Nations Championship

Sources
 Bath, Richard (ed.) The Scotland Rugby Miscellany (Vision Sports Publishing Ltd, 2007 )

References

1909 births
1993 deaths
People educated at the High School of Dundee
People educated at Strathallan School
Dundee HSFP players
Scottish rugby union players
Scotland international rugby union players
Midlands District players
Rugby union number eights